Nick Miles (born 15 December 1962) is an English actor. He is best known for his portrayal of Jimmy King in the ITV soap opera Emmerdale. Prior to appearing on Emmerdale, he made appearances in various television series such as Casualty and The Bill.

Early life
Miles was born and raised in Moseley, Birmingham, and he attended the Bromsgrove School. His father, John Bradney, was an actor and director of the a local theatre company.

Career
Miles appeared in the music video of the music video of "Come Back to What You Know", recorded by Embrace, playing the role of a policeman. In a similar role in television, he portrayed the role of Chief Supt Guy Mannion in The Bill, starring in 13 episodes between 1999 and 2001. Miles began appearing in Emmerdale from 19 February 2004, portraying the role of Jimmy King, as part of a new fictional family within the programme.

Filmography
The Bill as Ch. Supt. Guy Mannion (13 episodes, 1999–2001)
All Quiet on the Preston Front (1994) as Aspinall
Dandelion Dead (1994) TV Series as Sgt. Sharp
Ladybird Ladybird (1994) as Social worker
She's Out (1995) TV Series as Colin
Backup (1995) TV Series as PC John 'Thug' Barrett (unknown episodes)
Soldier Soldier as Derek Cavendish (1 episode, 1996)
The Loved (1998) as Man
Bugs as Dawson (1 episode, 1998)
Lock, Stock and Two Smoking Barrels - gambling scene with JD and Hatchett Harry (Cameo role, 1998)
Extremely Dangerous (1999) (TV) as Fraser
Harbour Lights as Lewis Badden (1 episode, 2000)
Casualty as Lenny (1 episode, 2001)
Two Men Went to War (2002) as Sgt. Mowat
Gangs of New York (2002) as Atlantic Guard Leader
Silent Witness as Sgt. Ron Allan (1 episode, 2002)
Peak Practice as Gary Wyatt (1 episode, 2002)
Shell (2002) as John
Heartbeat as Copley (1 episode, 2003)
You're Gonna Wake Up One Morning (2003) as Dealer
England Expects (2004) (TV) as Police officer
Emmerdale as Jimmy King (1,800+ episodes, 2004–present)

Awards and nominations

References

External links
 

Living people
People from Birmingham, West Midlands
English male soap opera actors
People educated at Bromsgrove School
1962 births